Reel People may refer to:

Reel people, an ethnic group of South Sudan 
Reel People (film),  a 1984 pornographic movie directed by Anthony Spinelli